A Trojan.WinLNK.Agent (also Trojan:Win32/Startpage.OS) is the definition from Kaspersky Labs of a Trojan downloader, Trojan dropper, or Trojan spy.

Its first known detection goes back to May 31, 2011, according to Microsoft Malware Protection Center. This Trojanware opens up an Internet Explorer browser to a predefined page (like to i.163vv.com/?96). Trojan Files with the LNK extension (expression) is a Windows shortcut to a malicious file, program, or folder. A LNK file of this family launches a malicious executable or may be dropped by other malware. These files are mostly used by worms to spread via USB drives (i.e.).

Other aliases 
 Win32/StartPage.NZQ (ESET) 
 Trojan.WinLNK.Startpage (Kaspersky Labs) 
 Trojan:Win32/Startpage.OS (Microsoft)

Other Variants 
 Trojan.WinLNK.Agent.ae
 Trojan.WinLNK.Agent.ew

Statistics 
 In 2016, India had the most incidents relating to this Trojan with 18,36 % worldwide.

External links 
 Analysis of a file at VirusTotal

References 

2011 in computing
Computer worms
Windows trojans